Brokenhead Wetland Ecological Reserve is an ecological reserve northeast of   Scanterbury, Manitoba, Canada. It was established in 2005 under the Manitoba Ecological Reserves Act.

Flora 

According to the Government of Manitoba's informational PDF about the site,

Among the carnivorous plants found in the reserve are the purple pitcher-plant, common butterwort, sundew and common bladderwort. The reserve includes a calcareous fen, a habitat that is essential to the survival of the rare plant species.

Conservation 
According to the Government of Manitoba's informational PDF about the site,

See also
 List of ecological reserves in Manitoba
 List of protected areas of Manitoba

References

External links
 debwendon: Brokenhead Wetland
 iNaturalist: Brokenhead Wetland Ecological Reserve

Protected areas established in 2005
Ecological reserves of Manitoba
Nature reserves in Manitoba
Protected areas of Manitoba